State Highway 26 (SH 26) is a state highway in the North Island of New Zealand, linking Hamilton with the Coromandel Peninsula. It starts from the Waikato Expressway at Ruakura on the eastern outskirts of Hamilton and travels 96 kilometres to Kopu, 6 kilometres south of Thames. It passes through Morrinsville, Te Aroha and Paeroa.

Major intersections

Route changes
When the Hamilton section of the Waikato Expressway opened in July 2022, the western terminus of SH 26 was rerouted from its old terminus on Cambridge Road in Hillcrest to Ruakura Road to connect to the new location of SH 1 in a full diamond interchange.

See also
List of New Zealand state highways

References

External links
New Zealand Transport Agency

26
Transport in Waikato